The 2018 Nor.Ca. Men's Handball Championship was the second edition of the Men's Nor.Ca. Men's Handball Championship. The tournament was held in Mexico City at the Centro deportivo Olimpico Mexicano from 3 to 8 April 2018. It acted as the North American and Caribbean qualifying tournament for the 2018 Pan American Men's Handball Championship.

Results

Round robin
All times are local (UTC−05:00).

Final standing

References

External links
Mexican Olympic Committee
Results at todor66

Nor.Ca. Men's Handball Championship
Nor.Ca. Handball Championship
International handball competitions hosted by Mexico
2018 in Mexican sports
Sports competitions in Mexico City
April 2018 sports events in Mexico